

Whitefield's sometimes Whitfield's Tabernacle is a former Calvinistic Methodist and Congregational (now United Reformed) church in Kingswood, a town on the eastern edge of Bristol where George Whitefield preached in the open air to coal miners. The name refers to two buildings in which the congregation met.

The congregation originally met in the New Society Room which was built in 1741 for George Whitefield and John Cennick after a separation occurred between them and John Wesley. The former Society Room building was expanded to a large size in 1802, and is a Grade I listed building. It is now roofless and derelict after an arson attack.

In 1851 a very large Gothic building, designed by Henry Masters, was constructed just west of the original tabernacle. Masters Church is Grade II listed. In 1983 this building was closed and the United Reformed Church congregation moved back into the original 18th-century building for a few years, before leaving both buildings to join together for worship with another congregation associated with the 18th-century revival, the Moravian Church, in the Moravian building on the other side of the High Street.

In 2003 the Tabernacle featured in the first series of BBC's Restoration programme.

As of 2007, there were plans for the redevelopment of the three listed buildings on the Tabernacle site, namely the two churches and the 18th century Chapel House. Besides various proposed memorial facilities, the plan included flats in the Chapel House and the 19th century building.

The Tabernacle is owned by the Whitfield Tabernacle Trust, who acquired the building in January 2019.

After years of disuse and dereliction following a fire in 2000, restoration work began on the tabernacle in 2021 with a view to turning it into a community arts centre following a £682,000 grant from Metro Mayor Dan Norris.

See also
 Churches in Bristol
 Grade I listed buildings in Bristol

References

External links

 Ordnance Survey 
 Whitfield Tabernacle Trust
 A Social History of Bristol in Photographs & Stories page on the Kingswood Tabernacle

 Whitfield Tabernacle Conservation Area
 Restoration - Whitfield Tabernacle at South Gloucestershire Council site
 The PG Group future project placeholder page with aerial artist's impression

18th-century churches in the United Kingdom
Churches in South Gloucestershire District
Grade I listed churches in Gloucestershire
Kingswood, South Gloucestershire
Religious buildings and structures in the United Kingdom destroyed by arson
Churches completed in 1741